, is a Japanese impressionist of the comedic performing arts from Toyooka, Hyōgo. She is best known for her impersonation of Hikaru Utada. Her professional activities are currently managed by Jinsei Pro.

Prior to her career as an Impressionist, she was a hairstylist.  She initially came to Tokyo to gain a position as a stylist at a renowned hair salon. Miracle has been noted to have a sheep phobia.

On January 23, 2008, Miracle Hikaru released "Miracle (1)," a hip-hop album in the mimicry style of Hikaru Utada. It has 8 tracks, distributed by King Records.

She has been featuring at various TV shows as humorist.

Works

Films
 2015: Galaxy Turnpike

Television
 2005 -: Kōhaku Uta Gassen
 FNS 26-jikan terebi kokumin-tekina omoshiro-sa! Shijō saidai! ! Manatsu no kuizu matsuri 26-jikan buttōshi supesharu (Fuji TV)
 Nakai Masahiro no burakkubaraeti (NTV)
 Toribianoizumi 〜 subarashiki muda chishiki 〜 (Fuji TV)
 Chi-chin puipui (Mainichihōsō) `kyō no dare?' No kōnā Kayō sapuraizu (NTV)
 Kayō sapuraizu (NTV)
 Monomaneōzaketteisen (Fuji TV)
 2011: Run for Money Tōsō-Chū (Fuji TV)
 2013: Hikaru ☆

Radio
 Miracle Hikaru no Mono Mane Paradise (FM Jungle)
 OH! MY RADIO with Hirai Ken (J-WAVE TOKYO FM)
 Shall Wee Talk (FM Jungle)

Web
 2007: Round and round Miracle (GyaO Jockey Internet TV)
 2007: Round and round Miracle Ring (GyaO Jockey Internet TV)

Stage
 2010: "Yoko" role at 7th performance of CM "TIME II"

Discography
 2008: Miracle 1

Idol DVD
 2010: It’Miracle
 2010: MIRACLE BODY
 2011: SWINUTION
 2011: Miracle Juice

Impression repertoire
Hikaru Utada
Anpanman
Mari Hamada
Ayumi Hamasaki
Paako Hayashiya
Mika Nakashima
Shizuka Kudō
Seiko Matsuda
Yumi Matsutoya
Aya Matsūra
Chisato Moritaka
Tomoko Nakajima (of Othello)
Yukie Nakama
Masami Nagasawa
Moe Oshikiri
Keiko Toda
Juri Ueno
You

References

External links
Jinsei Pro page
Blog
Blog at Ameblo
Avilla Profile

1980 births
Living people
Actors from Hyōgo Prefecture
Musicians from Hyōgo Prefecture
Japanese impressionists (entertainers)